Marisa Domingos Orth (born 21 October 1963) is a Brazilian actress, singer and TV host.

Selected filmography 
 Rainha da Sucata (1990)
   Deus nos Acuda  (1992)
 Sai de Baixo (1996)
 Por Trás do Pano (1999)
 Durval Discos (2002)
 So Normal (2003)
 Os Aspones (2004)
 Toma Lá, Dá Cá (2007)
 S.O.S. Emergência (2010)
 Família Vende Tudo (2011)
 Sangue Bom (2013)
 Dupla Identidade (2014)
 Haja Coração (2016)
 Tempo de Amar (2017)
 Bom Sucesso (2019)

References

External links 

1963 births
Living people
Actresses from São Paulo
Brazilian people of German descent
Brazilian television actresses
Brazilian telenovela actresses
Brazilian mezzo-sopranos
Brazilian film actresses
Pontifical Catholic University of São Paulo alumni